See Dad Run is an American television sitcom that premiered on Nick at Nite on October 6, 2012. It stars Scott Baio, who also serves as an executive producer. On March 17, 2014, Nick at Nite confirmed that season three would be the last.

After a decade on television (doing a show of the same name as the actual show's title), actor David Hobbs (Scott Baio) becomes a stay-at-home dad so his soap-opera star wife (Alanna Ubach) can get back in the spotlight, but he quickly realizes that playing a dad on television is much different from the real thing. He has to take care of his three kids, Emily (Ryan Newman), Joe (Jackson Brundage) and Janie (Bailey Michelle Brown) with the help of his best friends, Marcus (Mark Curry) and Kevin (Ramy Youssef). In June 2014, Nickelodeon released See Dad Run: The Complete First Season as a manufacture on demand (MOD) release through Amazon.com in region 1.

Cast

Main cast
 Scott Baio as David Hobbs
 Alanna Ubach as Amy Hobbs, David's wife
 Ryan Newman as Emily Hobbs, David and Amy's oldest daughter
 Jackson Brundage as Joe Hobbs, David and Amy's son
 Bailey Michelle Brown as Janie Hobbs, David and Amy's youngest daughter
 Ramy Youssef as Kevin Kostner, the production assistant of David's old sitcom, who helps David around the house
 Mark Curry as Marcus Barnes, the head writer of David's old sitcom who also lives across the street from him

Recurring cast
Jaylen Barron as Mary Barnes, Emily's best friend and Marcus' daughter
 Alyvia Alyn Lind as Charlotte, Janie's best friend
 Bebe Wood as Amanda, Joe's girlfriend
 Bridget Shergalis as Bea, Emily's friend
 Brianne Tju as Taylor, Emily's friend
 Danika Yarosh as Olivia, Emily's friend
 Luke Benward as Matthew Pearson, Emily's ex-boyfriend
 James Maslow as Ricky Adams, an actor who played David's son in his old sitcom
 Ted McGinley as a fictionalized version of himself
 Jack Griffo as Xander McGinley, Ted McGinley's son and Emily's ex-boyfriend
 Wendy Raquel Robinson, Marcus' wife

Episodes

Reception
See Dad Run has been met with mixed reviews from critics. On the review aggregator, Metacritic, the first season holds a score of 50 out of 100. David Hinckley from The New York Daily News gave the show 2 out of 5 stars. Emily Ashby of Common Sense Media gave it 4 out of 5 stars. Brian Lowry of Variety says "Baio doesn't do much to elevate the limp material, but he doesn't sink it either."

Production
On October 24, 2011, Nickelodeon greenlit a pilot of the series, then known under its working title Daddy's Home, making it the first original comedy on Nick at Nite. On March 27, 2012, 11 episodes were ordered.

On December 19, 2012, Nick at Nite renewed the series for a second season.

On October 21, 2013, the series was renewed for a third season.

On March 17, 2014, See Dad Run was canceled with production of the third season ending in May.

Syndication
See Dad Run aired on NickMom from January 1, 2013 to September 27, 2015, and aired on TeenNick for a short time from 2012 to 2013

References

External links
 
 

2010s American sitcoms
2012 American television series debuts
2014 American television series endings
English-language television shows
Nick at Nite original programming
Television series about families
Television shows set in Los Angeles